National AIDS Commission may refer to:
 National AIDS Commission of Indonesia
 Tanzania Commission for AIDS
 Uganda AIDS Commission
 National Commission on AIDS (USA)

See also 
 Latino Commission on AIDS (USA)
 National AIDS Trust, the UK's leading charity dedicated to transforming society's response to HIV